Envigado Fútbol Club is a Colombian professional football team based in Envigado, that currently plays in the Categoría Primera A. They play their home games at the Estadio Polideportivo Sur.

The club is renowned for the quality of its youth development and the number of international stars who have begun their careers with the team including James Rodríguez, Fredy Guarín, Juan Fernando Quintero, Jhon Córdoba, Mateus Uribe, Giovanni Moreno among others. It is frequently considered one of the best youth academies in South America, which is why it is known as "Cantera de Heroes" (Quarry of Heroes).

History 
The club was founded on 14 October 1989 and was the first Colombian team from the second division that was promoted to the Categoría Primera A in 1991.

Envigado was relegated from the Primera A in 2006 but was champion of the  2007 Primera B with the help of James Rodriguez and has played in the Primera A ever since.

Their first qualification for an international tournament was the Copa Sudamericana in 2012, where they were eliminated at the Second Stage after beating Unión Comercio of Peru 2–0 on aggregate and losing to Liverpool of Uruguay 2–1 on aggregate.

Honours

Categoría Primera B
Winners (2): 1991, 2007

Players

Current squad

Managers
 Hugo Castaño (1989 – 1991) 
 Luis Augusto García (1992)
 Fernando Castro (1993 – 1995)
 Gabriel Gómez (1995 – 1997)
 Norberto Peluffo (1997 – 1998)
 Carlos Navarrete (2002 – 2004)
 Orlando Restrepo (2005)
 Carlos Navarrete (2006)
 Jesús Barrios (2007 – October 2008)
 Óscar Aristizábal (Dec 15, 2008 – Nov 1, 2009)
 Ruben Dario Bedoya (Nov 2, 2009 – Jun 1, 2010)
 Pedro Sarmiento (Jul 30, 2010 – Apr 15, 2013)
 Juan Carlos Sánchez (April 2013 – May 2016)
 Ismael Rescalvo (June 2016 – August 2017)
 Rubén Darío Bedoya (August 2017 – August 2018)
 Juan Carlos Ramírez (September 2018 – December 2018)
 Eduardo Lara (January 2019 – December 2019)

References

External links

Official website

 
Football clubs in Colombia
Association football clubs established in 1989
Envigado
1989 establishments in Colombia
Categoría Primera A clubs
Categoría Primera B clubs